Jive Junction is a 1943 American comedy film directed by Edgar G. Ulmer and written by Irving Wallace, Walter Doniger and Malvin Wald. The film stars Dickie Moore, Tina Thayer, Gerra Young, John Michaels, Jack Wagner and Jan Wiley. The film was released on December 16, 1943, by Producers Releasing Corporation.

Plot
The young musician Peter Crane is transferred from the conservatory to a regular secondary school. There his music comes into conflict with the modern music of high school students. When he finds out that his father was killed in the war, he turns to jive. He soon leads his school's music group.

Cast      
Dickie Moore as Peter Crane
Tina Thayer as Claire Emerson
Gerra Young as Gerra Young
John Michaels as Jimmy Emerson
Jack Wagner as Grant Saunders
Jan Wiley as Miss Forbes
Beverly Boyd as Cubby
William Halligan as Mr. Maglodian 
Johnny Duncan as Frank
Johnny Clark as Chick
Friedrich Feher as Frederick Feher 
Caral Ashley as Mary
Odessa Lauren as Girl 
Robert McKenzie as Sheriff

References

External links
 

1943 films
American comedy films
1943 comedy films
Producers Releasing Corporation films
Films directed by Edgar G. Ulmer
American black-and-white films
1940s English-language films
1940s American films